Maria Olegovna Kochetkova (born 1984) is a Russian ballet dancer. She was a principal dancer with the San Francisco Ballet between 2007 and 2018, and with the American Ballet Theatre between 2015 and 2017. After that, she became a freelance dancer for several years, before joining the Finnish National Ballet in the 2020/21 season.

Early life
Kochetkova was born in Moscow. She trained at The Bolshoi Ballet Academy for eight years.

Career

After winning the Prix de Lausanne in 2002, Kochetkova danced with The Royal Ballet as an apprentice, then later danced at the English National Ballet for four years, during which she mostly danced corps roles but also the Sugar Plum Fairy in The Nutcracker.

In 2007, after Kochetkova took classes with the San Francisco Ballet, she joined the company as a principal dancer at the invitation of Helgi Tomasson. She danced roles such as Odette/Odile in Swan Lake, Swanilda in Coppélia , Tatiana in Onegin and lead role in Theme and Variations. She created roles such as David Dawson's Anima Animus and Christopher Wheeldon's Within the Golden Hour. She also danced the title role in the US premiere of Wheeldon's Cinderella.

Kochetkova performed the Grand Pas de Deux in San Francisco Ballet's Nutcracker which was broadcast by PBS in 2008 and won the solo gold medal in the NBC series Superstars of Dance. In 2013, she appeared in documentary Ballet's Greatest Hits, dancing the Don Quixote grand pas de deux, with Taras Domitro as Basilio and Skylar Brandt as the bridesmaid. She starred as Juliet in the 2015 filmed version of Romeo and Juliet. She also appeared in various music videos and advertisements. Kochetkova is also known for her social media presence, with hundred of thousands of followers around the world.

In 2015, Kochetkova joined the American Ballet Theatre but remained a principal dancer in San Francisco Ballet, and split her time between San Francisco and New York City. At ABT, she danced roles such as the title role in Giselle, Medora in Le Corsaire and Nikiya in La Bayadère. She remained a principal of ABT until 2017.

In 2018, Kochetkova left San Francisco Ballet after the company's Unbound Festival because she wanted more freedom and to be closer to her mother, who lives in Moscow.

Kochetkova now performs as a freelance dancer. She danced with the Norwegian National Ballet and Dresden Semperoper Ballett as a principal guest artist, and returned to English National Ballet as a guest artist. In 2019, Kochetkova presented her solo program, Maria Kochetkova: Catch Her If You Can at the Joyce Theater. It featured works by David Dawson and William Forsythe, as well as appearances of Sofiane Sylve, Carlo di Lanno and Drew Jacoby. In the 2020/21 season, Kochetkova joined the Finnish National Ballet as a lead principal dancer.

Selected repertoire 
Kochetkova's repertoire includes:

Personal life 
She is married to entrepreneur Edward King. She filed for divorce in October 2020. On February 7, 2023, Kochetkova revealed on Instagram that she is pregnant with her first child.

Awards 
Prix de Lausanne, 2002 - silver medal
Varna International Ballet Competition, 2002 - silver medal and jury prize
Isadora Duncan Dance Award, 2008 
Superstars of Dance, 2009 - gold medal
Prix Benois de la Danse, 2013 - nominated
Critics’ Circle National Dance Award (U.K.) for Best Female Dancer, 2014 - nominated
Premio Positano, 2017 - Ballerina of the Year
Sources:

See also
 List of dancers
 List of Russian ballet dancers

References

External links
 Official website

Russian ballerinas
American Ballet Theatre principal dancers
San Francisco Ballet principal dancers
English National Ballet dancers
Dancers of The Royal Ballet
Prix de Lausanne winners
Dancers from Moscow
1984 births
Living people
Moscow State Academy of Choreography alumni
Prima ballerinas
21st-century Russian ballet dancers
Russian expatriates in the United States